"Fairest Lord Jesus", also known as "Beautiful Savior", is a Christian hymn.

History
According to some accounts, it was called "Crusader's Hymn" because it was sung by German Crusaders as they made their way to the Holy Land. But William Jensen Reynolds dismisses as "completely erroneous" any association of this hymn with the Crusades. The words may have originated in the Jesuit Order, which came into being after the Crusades. The words were first printed in a Münster Gesangbuch of 1677, a Roman Catholic hymnbook. It must have become popular, in the manner of a folk-song, because it was recorded in 1839 by August Heinrich Hoffmann von Fallersleben in the district of Glaz in Silesia. With Ernst Friedrich Richter,  Hoffmann von Fallersleben edited a collection of Silesian folk-songs, Schlesische Volkslieder, in which the hymn appeared with its matching tune. 

The tune emerges in Franz Liszt's oratorio Legend of Saint Elizabeth—wherein the tune forms part of the "Crusader's March"—but no evidence of the tune exists prior to 1842, when the hymn appeared in Schlesische Volkslieder.

It was incorporated into the song "Eatnemen Vuelie" composed by Frode Fjellheim which was altered for the opening musical number of 2013 animated film Frozen (2013 film).

Melody
The tune, originally a Silesian folk song, and the German text were printed together for the first time in 1842 by  Hoffmann von Fallersleben and Richter under the name Schönster Herr Jesu (Most beautiful Lord Jesus).
 
In 1850 the Danish hymnwriter B. S. Ingemann  wrote , which he  set to the same melody. An English translation by Jens C. Aaberg was published as Fair Is Creation. Apart from their musical setting, the Danish and German lyrics are unrelated.

Lyrics
1873 translation by Joseph A. Seiss

Fairest Lord Jesus, Ruler of all nature,
O Thou of God and man the Son,
Thee will I cherish, Thee will I honor,
Thou, my soul’s glory, joy and crown

Beautiful Savior! Lord of all the nations!
Son of God and Son of Man!
Glory and honor, praise, adoration,
Now and forever more be Thine.

References

External links
 Original German (CPDL.org)
 Background information from Psalter Hymnal

American Christian hymns
Catholic hymns in German
German Christian hymns
Songs about Jesus
19th-century hymns
Year of song unknown
Songwriter unknown